Hornbeker Mühlenbach is a  long stream of Schleswig-Holstein, Germany. Its spring is near Niendorf an der Stecknitz and after passing a V-shaped valley it reaches its mouth near Hornbek into Elbe–Lübeck Canal. The river is crossing the Old Salt Route at the Mühlendamm.

It had special significance because it was part of the Limes Saxoniae since 810, which had been the border between the Abodriti and the Saxons.

See also
List of rivers of Schleswig-Holstein

Rivers of Schleswig-Holstein
Rivers of Germany